Daniel Murphy (10 May 1922 – 2001) was an English footballer who played as a wing half in the Football League between 1946 and 1957, for Bolton Wanderers, Crewe Alexandra and Rochdale. He made a total of 282 League appearances.

References

1922 births
2001 deaths
English footballers
Association football midfielders
English Football League players
Bolton Wanderers F.C. players
Crewe Alexandra F.C. players
Rochdale A.F.C. players